William Andrew Pogany (born Vilmos András Feichtmann (or Feuchtmann); August 24, 1882 – July 30, 1955) was a prolific Hungarian illustrator of children's and other books. His contemporaries include C. Coles Phillips, Joseph Clement Coll, Edmund Dulac, Harvey Dunn, Walter Hunt Everett, Harry Rountree, Sarah Stilwell Weber, and N.C. Wyeth. He is best known for his pen and ink drawings of myths and fables. A large portion of Pogany's work is described as Art Nouveau. Pogany's artistic style is heavily fairy-tale orientated and often feature motifs of mythical animals such as nymphs and pixies. He paid great attention to botanical details.  He used dreamy and warm pastel scenes with watercolors, oil paintings, and especially pen and ink.

Background
Pogany was born in Szeged, Austria-Hungary as Vilmos Feichtmann (aka Feuchtmann) to Heléne (née Kolisch) and Joseph Feichtmann. He studied at Budapest Technical University and in Munich and Paris. He spent his early childhood with his brothers and sisters in a large farmhouse full of chickens, ducks, geese, dogs, pigs, and horses.

When he was six, his parents took him to Budapest where he would later be sent to school.  He had early ambitions on becoming an engineer in the hopes of looking after his mother after his father died.  He especially liked to row and to play soccer. In his spare time, he drew pictures and painted.  He enjoyed painting and drawing so much he decided to be an artist.  He attended Budapest Technical School for less than a year, during this time he took art classes for six weeks. He sold his first painting to a wealthy patron for $24. In 1903, both he and his sister Paula legally changed their surname to Pogány and the Szeged City Council requested the rabbinate to correct their registration in the official Jewish records.

He spent his early twenties attending art school and would later travel to Munich, Paris, and London before coming to the United States in 1914. When Pogany went to Paris to study and paint, he was unable to secure much attention or income, was often poor and went hungry. Pogany spent two years in Paris.

When he finally saved up some money from his work, he left Paris to go to London. In 1906, Arthur Rackham's Rip Van Winkle gained massive popularity, sparking a demand for artists in London.   At this point Pogany was hired to provide the design For The Welsh Fairy Book by T. Fisher Unwin, including over 100 plates, illustrations, vignettes, chapter heads and tails, and initials.  He also did 48 illustrations for Milly and Olly, 70 for The Adventures of a Dodo and 39 for Faust.

After ten years in London, Pogany emigrated to America.  Besides book illustration, pictures, mural paintings, portraits, etchings, and sculptures, Pogany became interested in theatre and designed stage settings and costumes for different shows and the Metropolitan Opera House.  He eventually moved to Hollywood to serve as an art director for several film studios during the 1930s and 1940s.

Career

In London, he crafted his quartet of masterpieces: The Rime of the Ancient Mariner (1910), Tannhauser (1911), Parsifal (1912) and Lohengrin (1913). Each of these was designed completely by Pogany, from the covers and endpapers to the text written in pen and ink, pencil, wash, color and tipped-on plates.

The Ancient Mariner, a large book 9.5" by 11.75". is recognized as his masterpiece. Each page has at least two colors, sometimes with gilt plate accompanied by intricate borders. The initials are elaborate, starting each page and with ornate capitals at the beginning of every line. The illuminated title page, 18 color plates, the second color through black-and-white plates, the flowing calligraphic text, and the pen-and-ink drawings throughout the pages make this a stand out among Pogany's works.

The Rime's beauty is accentuated by its soft ivory paper and subtle lavender borders. The three gray stocks on Wagner's book add depth towards his presentation.

In Lohengrin, Pogany set his soft color pencil drawings against the grays.
In Tannhauser, Pogany used paper color for further additional dimension.
From soft pastel pencil drawings to watercolor paintings and pen and ink, Pogany utilized a variety of media in his illustrations.

Pogany's beautiful and bizarre illustrations for Padraic Colum's The King of Ireland's Son use brilliant color and startlingly modern styles of seeing to show the magical journey of the hero, his beloved Fedelma and the second hero Flann. A horse-headed giant has the great patient head of a Clydesdale plough horse; a girl bathes naked while the hero steals the swan skin that would allow her to transform and take flight, the young man leads a fine steed with Fedelma mounted on it as they are attacked by a cloud of crows – strange, dreamy, beautiful images.

Pogany worked as an art director on several Hollywood films, including Fashions of 1934 and Dames. He began his involvement in motion picture set design in 1924 and worked in film until the end of the 1930s. He was commissioned by John Ringling, Ettenger, Reiner and William Randolph Hearst's Wyntoon Estate, painted for the Barrymore family, Douglas Fairbanks Jr., Carole Lombard, Enrico Caruso, Miriam Hopkins, and many others.

Pogany was awarded gold medals in Budapest and Leipzig Expo as well as the London Masonic Medal, and became a Fellow of the London Royal Society of Art. The New York Society of Architects gave him a silver medal for his mural in the August Heckscher's Children's Theatre showing Cinderella, Hansel and Gretel, and Jack in the Beanstalk.  He won a gold medal in 1915 at the Panama Pacific Expo for his work The ValCares. and was also awarded the Hungarian Silver Blue Medal.

In 1914, Pogany's illustrations appeared on the cover of Metropolitan Magazine, Ladies Home Journal, Harper's Weekly, Hearst's Town and Country, Theatre Magazine and American Weekly. In 1917 to 1921, he worked for the Metropolitan Opera designing sketches, scenery and costumes. In 1918 he illustrated a children's retelling of Homer, The Adventures of Odysseus and the Tale of Troy written by Padraic Colum.

Lawsuit

In his 1952 autobiography Witness, Whittaker Chambers described "Willi Pogany" ("long a scene designer at the Metropolitan Opera House") as the brother of Joseph Pogany.

Willy Pogany sued Chambers for $1 million but lost in court and appeals.  According to Time magazine, "A lower court had found that Chambers, in his mistaken identification, had not maliciously implied that Willy was closely associated with 'a Communist leader and spy'," who had been "once (until Stalin liquidated him) Communist Hungary's puppet Commissar of War."

Personal life
Pogany married Lillian Rose Doris in 1908 in London, and had two sons with her: Peter and John Pogany. They moved to New York City in 1914  and he was naturalized in 1921.  In 1933 they divorced. The following year, he married writer Elaine Cox. He died in New York City on July 30, 1955.

Asked how his name was pronounced, he told the Literary Digest that in America it was po-GAH-ny. "However, in my native Hungary this name is pronounced with the accent on the first syllable with a slightly shorter o and the gany is as the French -gagne (the y is silent)": PO-gahn.

Works

Pogany's public art appears on walls of the John and Mable Ringling Museum of Art (formerly Ringling Mansion) in Sarasota, Florida, in New York City at the El Museo del Barrio theater (1230 Fifth Avenue), P.S. 43 Jonas Bronck in Mott Haven, and the Bernard B. Jacobs Theatre (45th Street) and in The Strand Theatre at The Appell Center for the Performing Arts in York, PA.

Written or illustrated by Pogany:
Kunos, I. - Turkish Fairy Tales, Burt 1901
Farrow, G. E. - The Adventures of a Dodo, Unwin 1907
Thomas, W. J. - The Welsh Fairy Book, Unwin 1907
Ward, M. A. - Milly and Olly, Unwin 1907
Edgar, M. G. A - Treasury of Verse for Little Children, Harrap 1908
Goethe, J. W. von - Faust, Hutchinson 1908
Dasent, G. W. - Norse Wonder Tales, Collins, 1909
Hawthorne, N. - Tanglewood Tales, Unwin, 1909
The Rubaiyat of Omar Khayyam, Harrap 1909
Coleridge, S. T. - The Rime of the Ancient Mariner, Harrap 1910
Gask, L. - Folk Tales from Many Lands, Harrap 1910
Young, G. - The Witch s Kitchen, Harrap 1910
Wagner, R. - Tannhauser, Harrap, 1911
Gask, L. - The Fairies and the Christmas Child, Harrap 1912
Wagner, H. - Parsifal, Harrap 1912
Heine, H. - Alta Troll, Sidgwick 1913
Kunos, I. - Forty-Four Turkish Fairy Tales, Harrap 1913
Pogany, W. - The Hungarian Fairy Book, Unwin 1913
Wagner, R. - The Tale of Lohengrin, Harrap 1913
Pogany, W. - Children, Harrap 1914
A Series of Books for Children, Harrap 1915
More Tales from the Arabian Nights, Holt 1915
Colum, P. - The King of Ireland's Son, Holt 1916
Swift, J. - Gulliver's Travels, Macmillan 1917
Bryant, S. C. - Stories to Tell the Little Ones, Harrap 1918
Colum, P. - Adventures of Odysseus, Macmillan 1918
Olcutt, F. J. - Tales of the Persian Genii, Harrap 1919
Skinner, E. L. - Children's Plays, Appleton 1919
Elias, E. - Red Riding Hood, Holt 1920
The Children of Odin, Harrap 1922
The Adventures of Haroun El Raschid, Holt 1923
Newman, I. - Fairy Flowers, Milford 1926
Flanders, H. H. - Looking Out of Jimmie, Dent 1928
Carroll, L. - Alice's Adventures in Wonderland, Dutton 1929
Pogany, W. - Mother Goose, Nelson 1929
Anthony, J. - Casanova Jones, Century 1930
Pogany, W. - Magyar Fairy Tales, Dutton 1930
Burton, R. F. - The Kasidah of Haji Abdu El-Yezdi, McKay 1931
Arnold, E. - The Light of Asia, 1932
 Arnold, E. - The Song Celestial or Bhagavad-Gita, 1934
Huffard, G. T. - My Poetry Book, Winston 1934
Pushkin, A. - The Golden Cockerel, Nelson 1938
Pogany, Elaine - Peterkin, 1940
Paula Pogany Bennett - The Art Of Hungarian Cooking, 1954

He illustrated more than 150 volumes, including:
The Adventures of Odysseus
The Tale of Troy
The Children of Odin
The Golden Fleece
The King of Ireland's Son
Gulliver's Travels
Bible Stories to Read and Tell
Little Tailor of the Winding Way
Tisza Tales
The Treasure of Verse for Little Children
Magyar Fairy Tales
Drawing Lessons
The Art of Drawing
Story of Hiawatha (c.1914)

Pogany wrote three instructional books: Willy Pogany's Drawing Lessons, Willy Pogany's Oil Painting Lessons, and Willy Pogany's Water Color Lessons, Including Gouache. He completed them at the end of his final years in New York.

References

External links

 JVJ Publishing – Biography
 American Art Archives – Will Pogany
 
 
 Children's Book Illustrators, archive of Pogany illustrations
Willy Pogany Children: Robinson Crusoe – full text and images onlineThe Fairies and the Christmas Child – full text and images online
Illustrations from The Children of Odin by Padraic Colum, 1920
Folk Tales From Many Lands – full text and images online

 

 
1882 births
1955 deaths
Hungarian illustrators
Hungarian children's book illustrators
People from Szeged
Art Nouveau illustrators
Austro-Hungarian expatriates in France
Austro-Hungarian expatriates in the United Kingdom
Austro-Hungarian emigrants to the United States
People with acquired American citizenship